Kit Zell is a retired American soccer forward who played one season in the North American Soccer League.

Zell played collegiate soccer at Seattle Pacific University from 1972 to 1975.  In 1976, the Portland Timbers selected Zell in the second round of the North American Soccer League draft.  He played two games as an amateur with the Timbers that season.  Zell currently teaches Healthy Living and Physical Education at the Bio/Med academy of Marysville Getchell High School in addition to Drivers Ed.

References

External links
 NASL stats

1954 births
Living people
Soccer players from Seattle
American soccer players
North American Soccer League (1968–1984) players
Portland Timbers (1975–1982) players
Seattle Pacific Falcons men's soccer players
Association football forwards